Helmut Rethemeier (born 8 June 1939) is a German equestrian and Olympic medalist. He competed in eventing at the 1976 Summer Olympics in Montreal, and won a silver medal with the German team.

References

1939 births
Living people
German male equestrians
Olympic equestrians of West Germany
Olympic silver medalists for West Germany
Equestrians at the 1976 Summer Olympics
Olympic medalists in equestrian
Medalists at the 1976 Summer Olympics
People from Herford (district)
Sportspeople from Detmold (region)